The 2017 North African Tri Nations was the second annual North African Tri Nations rugby union tournament held between the national rugby union teams of Algeria, Morocco and Tunisia. The 2017 tournament was held in Oujda between 17 and 23 December. Morocco won their second consecutive title after winning in the final against Algeria with a score of 20-13.

Venue
Stade Municipal d'Oujda, Oujda

Fixtures

Standings

2017 North African Tri Nations squads

Algeria
Head coach:  Boumedienne Allam

Morocco

Tunisia

Statistics

Try scorers

1 try
 Yazid Chouchane
 Boris Bouhraoua
 Rémi Cardon
 Yakine Djebbari

1 try (cont.)
 Sofian Youcef
 Djamel Ouchene
 ?
 ?

1 try (cont.)
 ?
 Mehdi Benyachou
 ?
 ?

Conversion scorers

4 conversions
 Yoan Saby
2 conversions
 Chakir Hmidouche

1 conversion
 Johan Bensalla
 Chamseddine Khalifa

Penalty goal scorers

6 penalties
 Chakir Hmidouche

4 penalties
 Chamseddine Khalifa

1 penalty
 Yoan Saby

References

External links
la 2e édition du Tri Nations du Maghreb - World Rugby official website

2017
International rugby union competitions hosted by Morocco
2017 in African rugby union
2017 rugby union tournaments for national teams
December 2017 sports events in Africa